Engelberg (lit.: mountain of angel(s)) is a village resort and a municipality in the canton of Obwalden in Switzerland. Besides the village of Engelberg, the municipality also includes the settlements of Grafenort, Oberberg and Schwand.

The municipality of Engelberg is an exclave of Obwalden, surrounded by the cantons of Bern, Nidwalden and Uri.

Engelberg is a major mountain resort in Central Switzerland. In the Middle Ages, Engelberg was known for the educational quality of its Benedictine monastery, Engelberg Abbey. From the 19th Century onwards Engelberg became internationally known as a mountain resort, but it is today visited as much for skiing as for its Alpine character. With its combination of modern snow and sports facilities and alpine location, Engelberg is popular today for both summer and winter tourism. The nearest large city is Lucerne.

The official language of Engelberg is (the Swiss variety of Standard) German, but the main spoken language is the local variant of the Alemannic Swiss German dialect.

History
Engelberg is first mentioned as Engilperc in 1122, when the Abbey was founded there, although the Alpine pasture of Trüebsee was already exploited collectively before this time.

In August 1815, the canton of Nidwalden was slow to accept the Federal Treaty while Engelberg declared support. Nidwalden finally accepted the new treaty on 18 August 1815 after federal troops marched into the canton. As a result, Engelberg was transferred to the canton of Obwalden.

From 1850, Engelberg became an international vacation resort (mineral water, milk serum and fresh air cures). Many hotels were built by the families Cattani, Hess and Odermatt, pioneers of tourism. From 1872 to 1874, a new, wider road was built, and the Stansstad-Engelberg electric railway was opened in 1898.

Hiking and other mountain sports developed at the end of the 19th century and Engelberg first held a winter season in 1903–1904. Gerschnialpbahn, a funicular railway (opened in 1913), connects Engelberg to Gerschni and, from there, the second cable car in Switzerland (opened in 1927) runs onwards to Ober Trüebsee. The decade preceding the First World War was a period of boom conditions (165,922 visitor-nights in 1911). The widening of the road and the extension of the railway to Lucerne (in 1964) considerably opened up the tourism catchment area of the station and, in 1967, the higher section of the Titlis cable car was opened. Recently, regular conferences in Engelberg came to supplement winter tourism. In 2000, the tertiary sector, especially tourism, offered three quarters of the employment of Engelberg.

Geography 

Engelberg is situated within the Uri Alps mountain range.

Engelberg is surrounded by major mountain summits, such as Titlis in the south above sea level), the Walenstöcke and Ruchstock to the north, Hahnen and Wissberg to the east, the Engelberger Rotstock and the Wissigstock to the northeast, and the upper valley of the Engelberger Aa leading to the Surenen Pass leading to the Urner Reusstal.

Of this area, about 27.1% is used for agricultural purposes, while 25.8% is forested. Of the rest of the land, 3.7% is settled (buildings or roads) and 43.5% is unproductive land. Of the agricultural land,  is fields and grasslands and  consists of alpine grazing areas. Rivers and lakes cover  in the municipality.

However the village is surrounded by the Alps, creating very steep terrain. The highest point in the borders of the municipality is the Titlis. The Engelberg Valley is drained by the Engelberger Aa, a tributary of Lake Lucerne. The valley is located southwards from the lake.

Transport 
The municipality of Engelberg is served by two stations on the Luzern–Stans–Engelberg line. Engelberg railway station is located in the village and is the terminus of the line. Grafenort station is to the north, one station away. Both stations are served by hourly InterRegio trains from the city of Lucerne.

A free bus system provides daytime transport within the village, with a network of seven routes during the winter season (from December through to April) and a single route during the summer season (from April until October).

Tourism 
The major tourist activities in the village and surrounding area are skiing and other snow sports in the winter season, and hiking and mountain activities during the summer.

In the village itself the main sights are the Benedictine monastery Engelberg Abbey which incorporates a cheese factory and demonstration shop, the Talmuseum showing the history of the area and Swiss rural life, and a number of old chapels.

The winter sports season generally lasts from December until April, although the high altitude glacier areas on the Titlis can sometimes be used (by advanced skiers) from October until May. Snow coverage is generally reliable, although in recent years artificial snow machines have been installed on some of the lower altitude runs in order to improve snow cover.

Engelberg hosts a round of the ski jumping World Cup at the Gross-Titlis-Schanze jump.

In common with the rest of Switzerland, there is a village celebration for Swiss National Day on 1 August, with parades and events throughout the day.

On the last Saturday in September the Alpabzug takes place, when the cattle are brought from the mountain pastures back to their winter barns in the village and valley.

There are three main mountain areas, accessible from the village, offering various activities in winter and summer. The cable cars generally run all year round, providing access for hikers and mountain bikers as well as skiers.

Titlis 

The Titlis mountain massif is accessible by cable cars of the Titlis Bergbahnen. The cable car bottom station is also the central terminus of the village bus services. A funicular railway (dating from 1913) runs up to station Gerschnialp and a wide Alpine pasture called Gerschni, with easy snow areas suitable for beginners and cross country ski trails, and a toboggan run leading back down to the valley station. In the summer there are two cheese dairies, with walking trails leading up to Ober Trüebsee and back down to the village, or level trails leading to Unter Trüebsee to the west.

The "Titlis Xpress" gondola lift, opened in 2015 to replace an older one dating from the 1970s, runs from the valley station up to the middle station Trübsee and on to Stand. A continuous ski piste leads down to Unter Trüebsee and back to the cable car valley station. In summer the lake is a popular walking area, with rowing boats available on the lake and picnic places around it. Walking routes lead over the Jochpass to Engstlenalp and Melchsee-Frutt, or directly from Engleberg over the Juchli Pass or Storegg Pass) into the Melchtal.

The "Rotair" cable car ("the world's first rotating cable car") runs up to the Kleintitlis mountain station where there is a restaurant and shops, an observation terrace and access to the glacier and summit. The high altitude glacier runs down from the peak are suitable for advanced skiers, with off-piste routes leading down to Trüebsee and the Laubersgrat ridge.

Brunni 
The Brunni mountain area, to the north of the village, is accessible from the cable car station which runs up to Ristis, with a further chair lift up to Brunnihütte. The ski runs here are of a beginner to medium standard, although sometimes not having so much snow cover as the Titlis side due to the south facing aspect. There is another toboggan run from Brunnihütte back down to Ristis. In summer there are a number of walking trails starting from here, including the Walenpfad leading to Bannalp and the Rot Grätli ridge across the mountains to the north and northeast. There are also a number of prepared rock climbing routes.

Fürenalp 
At the eastern end of the Engelberg valley, there is a cable car up to Fürenalp, passing over the Fürenwand rock climbing area. From the top station or from the valley, summer walking routes with views of the Chli Spannort and Gross Spannort mountain peaks lead to the Surenenpass in the east.

Heritage sites
Engelberg is home to three sites that are Swiss heritage sites of national significance; Engelberg Abbey with its library, archives and music collection, the mansion (Herrenhaus) in Grafenort and the Holy Cross chapel in Grafenort.

Demographics 
The historical population is given in the following table:

, 26.2% of the population are resident foreign nationals. In 2015 a small minority (259 or 6.3% of the population) was born in Germany. Over the last 6 years (2010-2016) the population has changed at a rate of 5.92%. The birth rate in the municipality, in 2016, was 8.3, while the death rate was 5.8 per thousand residents.

, children and teenagers (0–19 years old) make up 17.7% of the population, while adults (20–64 years old) are 61.4% of the population and seniors (over 64 years old) make up 20.9%. In 2015 there were 1,762 single residents, 1,808 people who were married or in a civil partnership, 230 widows or widowers and 297 divorced residents.

In 2016 there were 1,925 private households in Engelberg with an average household size of 2.10 persons. In 2015 about 43% of all buildings in the municipality were single family homes, which is about the same as the percentage in the canton (44.4%) and less than the percentage nationally (57.4%). Of the 1,302 inhabited buildings in the municipality, in 2000, about 48.5% were single family homes and 34.4% were multiple family buildings. Additionally, about 17.1% of the buildings were built before 1919, while 9.4% were built between 1991 and 2000. In 2015 the rate of construction of new housing units per 1000 residents was 8.3. The vacancy rate for the municipality, was 0.92%.

Most of the population speaks German as their mother tongue (88.2%), with Serbo-Croatian being second most common (2.5%) and English being third (2.2%).  the gender distribution of the population was 49.9% male and 50.1% female.

Politics

In the 2015 federal election small, local parties received 53.5% of the vote and the SVP received the remainder (46.5%). In the federal election, a total of 1,476 votes were cast, and the voter turnout was 56.4%.

In the 2007 election the most popular party was the SVP which received 37.4% of the vote. The next three most popular parties were a variety of other parties (not major) (28.6%), the CVP (22.7%) and the SPS (11.3%).

Education
In Engelberg about 65.5% of the population (between age 25–64) have completed either non-mandatory upper secondary education or additional higher education (either university or a Fachhochschule).

Religion

Business and industry 
Engelberg is classed as a tourist community.

, there were a total of 2,547 people employed in the municipality. Of these, a total of 143 people worked in 56 businesses in the primary economic sector. The secondary sector employed 267 workers in 54 separate businesses, of which 6 businesses employed a total of 117 employees. Finally, the tertiary sector provided 2,137 jobs in 372 businesses.

In 2016 a total of 8.3% of the population received social assistance. In 2011 the unemployment rate in the municipality was 1.1%.

In 2015 local hotels had a total of 354,960 overnight stays, of which 67.1% were international visitors.

In 2015 the average cantonal, municipal and church tax rate in the municipality for a couple with two children making  was 5.5% while the rate for a single person making  was 11.1%, both of which are much lower than the average for the canton. The canton has a slightly higher than average tax rate for those making  and one of the lowest for those making .

Due to the risks of filming in the disputed region of Kashmir, many Indian films requiring a Kashmir snowy mountain setting have been filmed in Engelberg in the recent past.

Cultural references 
Engelberg is mentioned in chapter XXIV of Henry James's 1875 novel Roderick Hudson.

Climate 
Between 1991 and 2020 Engelberg had an average of 151 days of rain or snow per year and on average received  of precipitation. However June had the most precipitation days (15.9) but only .

This area has a long winter season, with little precipitation mostly in the form of snow, and low humidity. The Köppen Climate System classifies the climate in Engelberg as Oceanic. MeteoSwiss's classification is Central Alpine northslope.

Notable people 

 Baroness Felicitas von Reznicek, (1904-1997 in Engelberg), German writer, a British agent during WWII
 Herbert Matter (1907–1984) an American photographer and graphic designer, used photomontage
 Giuseppe Piazzi (1907–1963 in Engelberg), bishop of Bergamo
 Hermann Hess Helfenstein (1916-2008) a Swiss naturalist, explorer, climber and engineer. 
 Jean-François Réveillard (born ca.1960), contemporary artist having his main studio in Engelberg since 2002

Sport 
 Rolf Olinger (1924–2006) a Swiss alpine skier and bronze medallist at the 1948 Winter Olympics
 Erika Hess (born 1962), bronze medallist at the Alpine skiing at the 1980 Winter Olympics
 Dominique Gisin (born 1985), gold medallist at the Alpine skiing at the 2014 Winter Olympics
 Denise Feierabend (born 1989) a Swiss former World Cup alpine ski racer.
 Michelle Gisin (born 1993) alpine ski racer, gold medallist at the 2018 & 2022 Winter Olympics.
 Lena Häcki (born 1995), Junior Biathlon silver medallist.
 Fabian Bösch (born 1997), Olympic freestyle skier and 2015 slopestyle gold medallist
 Fabio Scherer (born 1999), racing driver

References

External links 

Municipality Engelberg
Engelberg Tourism website
 
Titlis website
Brunni website

 
Municipalities of Obwalden
Ski areas and resorts in Switzerland
Cultural property of national significance in Obwalden